The 2009 Nordic Golf League was the 11th season of the Nordic Golf League, one of four third-tier tours recognised by the European Tour.

Schedule
The following table lists official events during the 2009 season.

Unofficial events
The following events were sanctioned by the Nordic Golf League, but did not carry official money, nor were wins official.

Order of Merit
The Order of Merit was based on prize money won during the season, calculated using a points-based system. The top five players on the tour (not otherwise exempt) earned status to play on the 2010 Challenge Tour.

See also
2009 Danish Golf Tour
2009 Swedish Golf Tour

Notes

References

Nordic Golf League